Keith Chapman is a British television writer and producer who created Bob the Builder and PAW Patrol.

Keith Chapman may also refer to:

 Keith Chapman (footballer) (1934–2007), Australian rules footballer
 Keith Chapman (organist) (1945–1989), American concert organist